Paul Snowden Lewis (born 1 November 1966 in Adelaide, Australia) is a former field hockey midfield player from Australia, who was a member of the Men's National Hockey Team. He twice won a medal at the Summer Olympics.

In his youth, Paul played for Forestville Hockey Club in South Australia, and attended Unley High School. Upon retiring from international hockey he would later earn a Bachelor of Laws, and is now a prominent lawyer in Perth, Australia.

He is the only South Australian male, and one of only 19 males overall to have played over 200 international games for Australia.

The perpetual shield for Hockey SA's U18 Men's State Junior Zone Championship is named after Paul.

References

External links
 
 Australian Olympic Committee
 Profile

1966 births
Australian male field hockey players
Male field hockey midfielders
Olympic field hockey players of Australia
Field hockey players at the 1992 Summer Olympics
Field hockey players at the 1996 Summer Olympics
1998 Men's Hockey World Cup players
Living people
Olympic silver medalists for Australia
Olympic bronze medalists for Australia
Field hockey players from Adelaide
Olympic medalists in field hockey
Medalists at the 1996 Summer Olympics
Medalists at the 1992 Summer Olympics
20th-century Australian people